Emilio Ulloa Pérez (born 31 May 1964) is a Mexican politician affiliated with the Citizens' Movement (formerly to the Party of the Democratic Revolution). As of 2014 he served as Deputy of the LX Legislature of the Mexican Congress representing the State of Mexico.

References

1964 births
Living people
People from Chiapas
Party of the Democratic Revolution politicians
Citizens' Movement (Mexico) politicians
21st-century Mexican politicians
Deputies of the LX Legislature of Mexico
Members of the Chamber of Deputies (Mexico) for the State of Mexico